Kashif Siddiq (born 31 December 1981) is a Pakistani first-class cricketer who played for Lahore cricket team.

References

External links
 

1981 births
Living people
Pakistani cricketers
Lahore cricketers
Cricketers from Lahore